WXJK is a classic rock formatted broadcast radio station licensed to Farmville, Virginia, serving the Farmville/Crewe/Dillwyn/Cumberland area.  WXJK is owned and operated by David W. Layne.

References

External links
101.3 FM the X Online

XJK
Radio stations established in 1990
Classic rock radio stations in the United States